Protect and Survive is a Big Finish Productions audio drama based on the long-running British science fiction television series Doctor Who. It was released on CD and download in July 2012, and was first broadcast on BBC Radio 4 Extra on 17 November 2013 as part of the Doctor Who 50th-anniversary celebrations.

Plot
The Doctor has disappeared, and the TARDIS is out of control. Ace and Hex find themselves marooned on Earth in the 1980s at the height of the Cold War.

Cast
Seventh Doctor – Sylvester McCoy
Ace – Sophie Aldred
Hex – Philip Olivier
Albert Marsden – Ian Hogg
Peggy Marsden – Elizabeth Bennett
Moloch / Patrick Allen (announcer) – Peter Egan

Continuity
The exterior of the TARDIS was rendered white during the events of The Angel of Scutari.  It remained as such for the previous trilogy of stories, Project: Destiny, A Death in the Family and Lurkers at Sunlight's Edge.
The TARDIS with the black exterior was inexplicably seen in a trilogy of solo Seventh Doctor stories, Robophobia, The Doomsday Quatrain and House of Blue Fire, which, for the Doctor, take place between Lurkers at Sunlight's Edge  and Protect and Survive.  It is also in Project: Nirvana, which takes place just before Protect and Survive.
Peggy Marsden returns in Gods and Monsters.

Notes
The Doctor is absent for most of the adventure. This was due to Sylvester McCoy appearing in the feature-film adaptation of J.R.R. Tolkien's The Hobbit at the time of Protect and Survive'''s recording.
Ian Hogg played Josiah Samuel Smith in the 1989 Seventh Doctor television story, Ghost Light.
Peter Egan recreates the late Patrick Allen's original voice-over for the real-life Protect and Survive public information announcements, which form a key part of the plot.
The commander of the Russian missile base is named Petrov. On 26 Sept 1983, Lt Col Stanislav Petrov averted a nuclear exchange  by reasoning that an apparent American pre-emptive strike was a false alarm.

Critical receptionDoctor Who Magazine'' reviewer Matt Michael strongly praised the play, noting that it was "one of the bleakest" made by Big Finish.

References

External links
Big Finish Productions – Protect and Survive

2012 audio plays
Seventh Doctor audio plays
Fiction set in 1989
Cold War fiction